The Stephanosporaceae are a family of fungi in the order Agaricales. Species in the family, known from Eurasia and New Zealand, grow on the ground with rotting wood or plant debris. , Index Fungorum lists 8 genera and 35 species in the family. Stephanosporaceae was circumscribed in 1979 by mycologists Franz Oberwinkler and Egon Horak.

References

External links

Agaricales families
Taxa named by Franz Oberwinkler
Taxa named by Egon Horak
Agaricales
Taxa described in 1979